James Coomarasamy is a British presenter of the BBC Radio 4 evening programme The World Tonight and the flagship Newshour programme on the BBC World Service.

Before joining Newshour in 2010, Coomarasamy spent a year presenting the now defunct programme Europe Today.  Before becoming a presenter (announcer) he had been a BBC correspondent in Warsaw, followed by Paris, then Washington, D.C.

Early life
Coomarasamy was born in London to parents of English and Sri Lankan ancestry. He was educated at Christ's Hospital School, an independent school for boys (now co-educational), near Horsham, West Sussex, followed by the University of Cambridge, where he studied modern and medieval languages. He is fluent in French and Russian, and he speaks some Polish.

Career
Coomarasamy has worked primarily for the BBC.
 1991. Production assistant in the BBC Moscow bureau, after which he freelanced in Moscow as a reporter-producer
 Producer for the BBC World in London  
 December 1994. Returned to Moscow as the bureau's bi-media producer, covering major stories such as the war in Chechnya
 November 1997. In Warsaw as the BBC correspondent covering events in Poland, the Baltics and Ukraine 
 From 1999 to 2003. The BBC's Paris reporter, covering for both radio and television
 From February 2005. Correspondent in Washington, D.C., for North America
 2009. Presented Europe Today for the BBC World Service
 2010. Joined the presentation team for Newshour on the BBC World Service

Personal life
Coomarasamy is married to Nanette van der Laan. They have two children: Maya and Finn.

References

External links
Twitter

British television presenters
BBC newsreaders and journalists
BBC World Service presenters
BBC World News
British reporters and correspondents
Living people
English people of Sri Lankan Tamil descent
Year of birth missing (living people)